Statistics of Primera Divisió for the 1996–97 season.

Overview
It was contested by 12 teams, and Principat won the championship.

League table

Results

References

Primera Divisió seasons
Andorra
1996–97 in Andorran football